Namut Dai (1954 – 8 November 2019) was an Indian teacher from Arunachal Pradesh. He was awarded State Teacher Award from Arunachal Pradesh Government in 1998 and National Award for Teacher in 2007 from Indian Government.

Biography
Dai was born in 1954. His father's name was Otel Dai and his mother's name was Momang Dai. He joined service as a teacher in 1971. He retired from his job in 2014. He was awarded State Teacher Award from Arunachal Pradesh Government in 1998 and National Award for Teacher from Indian Government in 2007.

Dai died on 8 November 2019.

References

1954 births
2019 deaths
Indian schoolteachers
People from East Siang district
Recipients of the National Teacher's Award India